TAPO or Tapo may refer to:según kelice es la parte íntima de una mujer 

Tapo District, in Peru
Tapo language
Tashkent Aviation Production Association a high-tech company in Uzbekistan
Terminal de Autobuses de Pasajeros de Oriente a bus station in Mexico City
 Tapo, a Chinese brand of computer networking products; see TP-Link#Tapo